Mark Stephen Burke (born 12 February 1969) is an English former footballer who played as a midfielder. A player skilled at retaining the ball, he enjoyed a 15-year professional career in England, the Netherlands, Japan, Romania, and Sweden.

He began his career at Aston Villa, turning professional in February 1987. He was sold on to Middlesbrough for £50,000 in December 1987, and played for Fourth Division champions Darlington on loan in October 1990. He transferred to Wolverhampton Wanderers for a £25,000 fee in March 1991, before playing on loan at Luton Town in March 1994. He signed with Port Vale in August 1994, before moving on to Fortuna Sittard the following year. He joined Omiya Ardija in 1999, before signing with TOP Oss via Rapid Bucharest and IF Brommapojkarna in 2001, helping the latter to the Division 2 Östra Svealand title.

Career
Burke joined Aston Villa as a youth team scholar in June 1985 and played for England Schoolboys, before signing professionally in February 1987. He made his senior debut in a 1–0 defeat to Everton on 18 April 1987, as the "Villans" were relegated out of the First Division in 1986–87. They were immediately promoted in 1987–88, but Burke managed only eight appearances for the club before joining fellow Second Division side Middlesbrough for £50,000 in December 1987.

"Boro" ended the campaign behind second placed Aston Villa on goals scored, yet they too won promotion after beating Chelsea in the promotion/relegation play-offs to claim a place in the top flight; Burke did not feature in either leg of the play-off final. They finished one place and one point behind Aston Villa in 1988–89, but this time their inability to surpass his former club cost them, as they occupied the final relegation place. "Boro" plummeted to 21st in the second tier in 1989–90, finishing just two points ahead of relegated Bournemouth. Burke was largely on the sidelines after falling out with manager Bruce Rioch, and after a spell on loan at Darlington in October 1990, he finally left Ayresome Park in search of regular football at Wolverhampton Wanderers, signing for a £25,000 fee in March 1991. This move reunited him with Graham Turner, who had been Villa manager at the time of Burke's arrival there. Darlington went on to top the Fourth Division in 1990–91, whilst Wolves finished 12th in the Second Division.

The midfielder made his Wolves debut in a 3–3 draw with Oxford United on 16 March 1991, but was again unable to hold down a regular first team spot. The club improved slightly to post an 11th-place finish in 1991–92. His best season at Molineux came in 1992–93 when he managed 34 appearances, scoring 8 times – the best seasonal tally of his career, as Wolves again came 11th. He was again on the periphery for the following campaign, as his side finished 8th, three points behind Derby County in the play-offs.

After a short spell on loan at First Division rivals Luton Town in March 1994, he returned to his parent club to find Graham Taylor, another of his former managers from his Villa days, was now at the helm. Burke was unable to win a place in Taylor's plans though, and had a trial at Tottenham Hotspur, before eventually joining Port Vale in August 1994. He scored twice in 15 First Division games under manager John Rudge in 1994–95, before quitting England to explore foreign football.

His first foreign club were Fortuna Sittard in the Dutch Eredivisie, where he played under Pim Verbeek. Burke had been recommended to the club by Terry Lees. He scored the winning goal on his debut against De Graafschap. Fortuna finished 13th in the Eredivisie in 1995–96, 11th in 1996–97, 7th in 1997–98, and 10th in 1998–99. He did not get along with new boss Bert van Marwijk, and so followed Pim Verbeek all the way to J2 League club Omiya Ardija in June 1999. He scored five goals in 20 games in 1999 and 4 goals in 31 games in 2000. Burke eventually returned to Europe after his contract expired in Japan and spent some time training with Fortuna Sittard again before signing for Rapid Bucharest on a short-term contract in March 2001, making him the first English footballer to ever play in Romania. Rapid finished fourth in Liga I in 2000–01. Burke moved on to Swedish Division 2 club IF Brommapojkarna, and helped his new club to the Östra Svealand title in 2001. He then played four games for TOP Oss of the Eerste Divisie in 2001–02.

Style of play
He has been described as "sure of touch, calm of mind, he would lope around in seemingly lackadaisical fashion before offering a cute little pass here or a deft touch there. A man with an eye for ball retention."

Personal life
In 2013 Burke released his first eBook A different kind of soccer book, aimed at children, coaches and parents.

He is capable in several languages: English, Spanish and Dutch.

Career statistics
Source:

Honours
Darlington
Football League Fourth Division: 1990–91

IF Brommapojkarna
Division 2 Östra Svealand: 2001

References

External links

1969 births
Living people
Sportspeople from Solihull
English footballers
England youth international footballers
Association football midfielders
Aston Villa F.C. players
Middlesbrough F.C. players
Darlington F.C. players
Wolverhampton Wanderers F.C. players
Luton Town F.C. players
Port Vale F.C. players
English expatriate footballers
Expatriate footballers in the Netherlands
Fortuna Sittard players
English expatriate sportspeople in Romania
English expatriate sportspeople in Japan
Expatriate footballers in Japan
Omiya Ardija players
Expatriate footballers in Romania
FC Rapid București players
Expatriate footballers in Sweden
IF Brommapojkarna players
TOP Oss players
English Football League players
Eredivisie players
Eerste Divisie players
J2 League players
Liga I players